Aislabie may refer to:

Benjamin Aislabie (1774–1842), English cricket administrator and cricketer
Francis Aislabie (by 1515–1557), English politician.
John Aislabie (1670–1742), British politician
Several 18th century public servants called William Aislabie